Wergea is a village in Leeuwarden municipality in the province of Friesland, the Netherlands. It had a population of around 1,560 in January 2017.

There are two windmills in the village, De Hempenserpoldermolen and a paaltjasker.

History
The village was first mentioned in 944 as Wartengahe. The etymology is unknown. Wergea is a terp (artificial living mound) village from the early middle ages. During the 16th and 17th century, it developed due to good water connections and became a centre of trade and shipping. In 1664, the widow's court was founded by Vrouck van Popma for poor widows. The wooden buildings were rebuilt in 1864.

The polder mill De Hempenserpoldermolen was built in 1863. In 1955, a pumping station was opened and the windmill became obsolete. The owner wanted to demolish it, however it was transferred to the water board for ƒ 2,-. In 1988, the mill was restored.

In 1840, Wergea was home to 873 people. The Roman Catholic St. Martinus Church was built between 1860 and 1862. In 1860, the terp was excavated. In 1886, the first cooperative dairy factory of the Netherlands opened in Wergea. The company is nowadays - after many mergers - known as Friesland Foods, however the Wergea factory closed in 1994.

Notable people 
 Annie van der Meer (1928—2004), speed skater

References

Gallery

External links

Leeuwarden
Populated places in Friesland